Genocide: Its political use in the Twentieth Century is a 1981 book by the sociologist Leo Kuper about genocide. The historical examples studied include the Armenian genocide, the Holocaust, the 1971 Bangladesh genocide, Ache in Paraguay, and Ikiza (the Burundian genocide of 1972).

Overview
The book examines the phenomenon of genocide in the 20th century, tracing its origins, causes, and consequences.

Kuper argues that genocide is not simply the result of individual actions or madness, but rather a deliberate and organized strategy pursued by states or other powerful actors to achieve specific political goals.  

Kuper criticises the legal definition stated in the UN (Genocide) Convention. For example, the West wanted a provision labeling the destruction of political groups as genocide, but the Soviets blocked it; conversely, the Soviets wanted cultural genocide included, and the West blocked that. He also blames the many genocides of recent years on the failure of the United Nations and the major powers to enforce the UN (Genocide) Convention.

Kuper's analysis focuses on the political, economic, and social factors that have led to genocide, including nationalism, colonialism, racism, and social inequality. He also discusses the ways in which genocide has been used as a tool of political power and control, and how it has been legitimized and rationalized by those who perpetrate it. Professor of Law Daniel Turak reviewed the book and stated "Furthermore, the author explains the relationship of colonization, decolonization and successor states to genocide." He argues that some states have claimed sovereignty to attack rivals, while the UN and the Organization of African Unity are ineffective: "The author concludes that these organizations have condoned the crime by delay, evasion and subterfuge."

Reception
It was reviewed in a number of periodicals, including  The New York Times and the Virginia Quarterly Review.

References

History books about genocide
Non-fiction books about the 1971 Bangladesh genocide
Massacres in Burundi
1981 non-fiction books